Operation Eagle's Feather is an operation in which the Polish Army, supported by the Afghan Armed Forces, carried out an offensive against the Taliban in Afghanistan as part of the War on Terror.  The Polish Army targeted and attacked a number of weapons dumps and Taliban radio masts.  This was the largest operation of the Polish Army during the War on Terror in Afghanistan.  According to Gazeta Wyborcza, about 800 Polish soldiers were involved in the operation.

Aftermath 
During the operation, the weapons dumps and radio masts were successfully destroyed.  Several of the Polish Army's vehicles were damaged and three Polish soldiers were wounded.  The number of casualties received by the Taliban is unknown.

See also 
 Operation Achilles
 List of wars involving Poland

References

External links 
Warsaw Business Journal article
Military operations of the War in Afghanistan (2001–2021)